Ancient Anatolia may refer to:
Prehistory of Anatolia
Iron Age Anatolia
Classical Anatolia

See also
Ancient kingdoms of Anatolia
Anatolian peoples